Rider of the Law is a 1927 American silent Western film directed by Paul Hurst and starring Al Hoxie, Ione Reed and Cliff Lyons.

Cast
 Al Hoxie as John McCrea
 Ione Reed as Marion
 Paul Hurst as Henry Baker
 Alfred Hewston as Will Kelly
 Cliff Lyons as Jimmy - Marion's Brother
 Bud Osborne as Henchman

References

Bibliography
 Langman, Larry. A Guide to Silent Westerns. Greenwood Publishing Group, 1992.

External links
 

1927 films
1927 Western (genre) films
American black-and-white films
Films directed by Paul Hurst
Silent American Western (genre) films
1920s English-language films
1920s American films